Salevere may refer to several places in Estonia:

Salevere, Lääne County, village in Hanila Parish, Lääne County
Salevere, Pärnu County, village in Koonga Parish, Pärnu County